Chrysosplenium (golden saxifrage or golden-saxifrage) is a genus of 57 species of flowering plant in the family Saxifragaceae. Species can be found throughout the Arctic and northern temperate parts of the Northern Hemisphere, with the highest species diversity in eastern Asia; two species are found disjunctly in South America.

They are soft herbaceous perennial plants growing to 20 centimeters tall, typically in wet, shady locations in forests. The leaves are rounded, palmately veined, with a lobed margin and arranged either alternately or opposite, depending on the species. The flowers are small, yellow or yellowish-green, with four petals; they are produced in small clusters at the apex of the shoots surrounded by leafy bracts. Most of the growth and flowering is in early spring, when more light is available under deciduous trees.

Selected species

Chrysosplenium absconditicapsulum
Chrysosplenium alpinum (alpine golden saxifrage)

Chrysosplenium alternifolium (alternate-leaved golden saxifrage)
Chrysosplenium americanum (American golden saxifrage)
Chrysosplenium axillare
Chrysosplenium biondianum
Chrysosplenium carnosum
Chrysosplenium cavaleriei
Chrysosplenium chinense
Chrysosplenium davidianum
Chrysosplenium delavayi
Chrysosplenium dubium

Chrysosplenium flagelliferum
Chrysosplenium forrestii
Chrysosplenium fuscopuncticulosum
Chrysosplenium giraldianum
Chrysosplenium glechomifolium (Pacific golden saxifrage)
Chrysosplenium glossophyllum
Chrysosplenium griffithii
Chrysosplenium hebetatum
Chrysosplenium hydrocotylifolium
Chrysosplenium iowense (Iowa golden saxifrage)
Chrysosplenium japonicum
Chrysosplenium jienningense
Chrysosplenium lanuginosum
Chrysosplenium lectus-cochleae
Chrysosplenium lixianense
Chrysosplenium macranthum
Chrysosplenium macrophyllum
Chrysosplenium microspermum

Chrysosplenium nepalense
Chrysosplenium nudicaule

Chrysosplenium oppositifolium (opposite-leaved golden saxifrage)
Chrysosplenium oxygraphoides
Chrysosplenium pilosum
Chrysosplenium pseudopilosum
Chrysosplenium qinlingense
Chrysosplenium ramosum
Chrysosplenium serreanum
Chrysosplenium sikangense
Chrysosplenium sinicum
Chrysosplenium taibaishanense
Chrysosplenium tenellum
Chrysosplenium trichospermum
Chrysosplenium tetrandrum (northern golden saxifrage)
Chrysosplenium uniflorum
Chrysosplenium valdivicum
Chrysosplenium wrightii (Wright's golden saxifrage)
Chrysosplenium wuwenchenii

Culinary uses
The leaves and stems of golden saxifrage (C. alternifolium and C. oppositifolium) can be eaten in salads or as cooked greens.

See also

References

External links
Jepson Manual Treatment

 
Saxifragaceae genera